Vrhnika is a town in Slovenia. It is the seat of the Municipality of Vrhnika. It is located on the Ljubljanica River, 21 km from Ljubljana along the A1 motorway.

Geography

Vrhnika lies at the southwest end of the Ljubljana Marsh near the sources of the Ljubljanica River, where the Ljubljana Basin opens up between the foot of Ljubljana Peak and Ulovka Hill. The territory of the town extends south onto the Logatec Plateau, where the Big and Little Drnovica Collapse Sinkholes are found. A rich network of springs and streams originates and joins near the town to form the source of the Ljubljanica.

Name
The settlement at the location of today's Vrhnika was attested in antiquity as Nauportus in Latin, and as Ναύποντος and Νάμπορτος in Greek. Medieval attestations of the name include  in 1300, Oberlaybach in 1308 (and Ober Laybach in 1309), and Vernich in 1481, corresponding to the modern Slovene name. In the past, the town was known as Oberlaibach in standard German. The Slovene name is probably a compound of vrh 'top, summit' + nika or  'creek, spring', referring to the source of the Ljubljanica River. The Latin name Nauportus is a compound of navis 'boat' + portus 'transfer', referring to a place where cargo had to be transferred from boats to pack animals or carts along a trade route. A mythological reinterpretation of the Latin name as referring to the portage of a boat itself (specifically, the Argo) appears in Pliny the Elder's Natural History.

History
In Roman times, Nauportus was an important communication point. Vrhnika as it exists today started to develop in the High Middle Ages.

Vrhnika became a market town and was among the wealthiest towns in Carniola up to the early 18th century, when it started to lose importance. Nevertheless, it remained one of main transportation junctions in Inner Austria because of its strategic location on the crossroads between the trade routes from Trieste to Vienna and from Rijeka to Klagenfurt. The development of the town was strongly impaired by the construction of the Austrian Southern Railway in the 1840s, which bypassed it. From then on, it started losing importance, becoming a satellite town of Ljubljana, which has remained up to this day.

Mass grave

Vrhnika is the site of a mass grave from the period immediately after the Second World War. The Pikec Valley Mass Grave is located at the bottom of a sinkhole southwest of the town, on Sveč Hill near the Vojc house. It contains the remains of six German prisoners of war that were murdered in May 1945.

Notable people
Notable people that were born or lived in Vrhnika include:

Baltazar Baebler (1880–1936), chemist
Arnošt Brilej (1891–1953), hiking and tourism specialist
Ivan Cankar (1876–1918), writer
Karel Cankar (1877–1953), journalist and editor
Stane Dremelj (1906–1992), painter
Karel Grabeljšek (1906–1985), writer
Janko Grampovčan (1897–1974), economist
Francis Jager (1869–1934), beekeeping and orchard expert
Gabrijel Jelovšek (1858–1927), merchant
France Kunstelj (1914–1945), author, playwright, and editor
Franc Lah (1816–1890), sculptor
Andrej Lenarčič (1859–1936), agricultural specialist
Josip Lenarčič (1856–1939), merchant
Anton Maier (1859–1943), education specialist
Ignacij Mihevc (1870–1939), politician and journalist
Floris Oblak (1924–2006), poet and writer
Simon Ogrin (1851–1930), painter
Franc Popit (1921–2013), communist politician
Radoslav Silvester (1841–1923), poet and composer
Ignac Voljč (nom de guerre Fric; 1904–1944), People's Hero of Yugoslavia
Jakob Voljč (1878–1900), poet and writer

References

External links

 Vrhnika, Visit Vrhnika
 Vrhnika, official page of the municipality 
 Vrhnika on Geopedia
 Vrhnika on Google Maps

Populated places in the Municipality of Vrhnika
Cities and towns in Inner Carniola